Attorney General Kennedy may refer to:

Robert F. Kennedy (1925–1968), Attorney General of the United States
Hugh Kennedy (1879–1936), Attorney General of Ireland

See also
General Kennedy (disambiguation)